Instituto Francisco Possenti, A.C. (IFP) is a private school in Colonia Olivar de los Padres, Álvaro Obregón, Mexico City. The school serves levels primary through senior high school (preparatoria).

References

External links
 Instituto Francisco Possenti 

High schools in Mexico City